Richard McCulloch (born 1949) is an American author who has written several books advocating white nationalism.

Theories

McCulloch promoted the phrase "declaration of racial independence" in his 1994 book The Racial Compact. In this book he claimed that every race had a requirement for "its own exclusive racial territory or homeland, its own independent and sovereign government". McCulloch has given his views in the white supremacist magazine American Renaissance.  In a 1995 article on "Separation for Preservation", he alleged that there was evidence "that a multiracial society is detrimental to the interests of European-Americans", going on to say that "Separation ... is necessary for [White] racial preservation". He is the author of "The Racial Compact", a website that advocates the maintenance of "racial purity".

In his 2005 book on the Melungeons, Walking Toward The Sunset: The Melungeons Of Appalachia, Wayne Winkler notes that McCullogh "espouses views that seem dated to many Americans today, but were widely held in the not-to-distant past ... since then, the idea of 'racial purity' has been largely - but not completely - discredited". As late as 2005, McCulloch's writings were being promulgated by Föreningen för Folkens Framtid (FFF, Association for the People's Future), a Swedish neo-Nazi networks.

Bibliography

References

Further reading
Richard McCulloch's online book "The Racial Compact"

American white nationalists
1949 births
Living people